Fabian Friedemann Graudenz (born 16 January 1992) is a German footballer who plays as a midfielder for FC Teutonia Ottensen.

References

External links
 

Living people
1992 births
German footballers
Footballers from Hamburg
Association football midfielders
3. Liga players
Regionalliga players
Hamburger SV II players
Alemannia Aachen players
FSV Frankfurt players
FC Energie Cottbus players
SC Weiche Flensburg 08 players
1. FC Phönix Lübeck players
FC Teutonia Ottensen players